Tagaya is a Japanese surname. Notable people with the surname include:

, Japanese politician

Japanese-language surnames